The Embassy of Trinidad and Tobago in Washington, D.C. is the diplomatic mission of the Republic of Trinidad and Tobago to the United States. It is located at 1708 Massachusetts Avenue, Northwest, Washington, D.C., in the Embassy Row neighborhood, near Scott Circle.

The Ambassador is HE Brigadier General (Ret'd.) Anthony W.J Phillips-Spencer.

References

External links

Official website

Trinidad and Tobago
Washington, D.C.
Trinidad and Tobago–United States relations
Trinidad and Tobago
Dupont Circle